Uzma Riaz  is a Pakistani politician who had been a member of the National Assembly of Pakistan from August 2018 till January 2023z

Education
She has done her Masters in Economics.

Political career
She was elected to the National Assembly of Pakistan as a candidate of Pakistan Tehreek-e-Insaf (PTI) on a reserved seat for women from Khyber Pakhtunkhwa in 2018 Pakistani general election.

Resignation

In April 2022, he also resigned from the National Assembly seat along with all Tehreek-e-Insaaf members after the Foreign-imposed Regime Changeby the United States.

External Link

More Reading
 List of members of the 15th National Assembly of Pakistan
 List of Pakistan Tehreek-e-Insaf elected members (2013–2018)
 No-confidence motion against Imran Khan

References

Living people
Pakistan Tehreek-e-Insaf MNAs
Politicians from Khyber Pakhtunkhwa
Pakistani MNAs 2018–2023
Year of birth missing (living people)